Nyberg may refer to:

 Nyberg (surname), including a list of people with the name
 Nyberg Automobile, a defunct auto manufacturer in Indiana, U.S.
 15492 Nyberg, an asteroid